Enamul Haque Chowdhury (1948–2011) was a politician in Sylhet District of Bangladesh who was a Jatiya party leader and Member of Parliament from Sylhet-2.

Birth and early life 
Enamul Haque Chowdhury was born in 1948 to Bashirul Haque and Sayra Khanom in Gohorpur, Sylhet, East Bengal, Dominion of Pakistan (now in Balaganj Upazila, Bangladesh).

Career  
He was elected to Parliament in 1979 and 1986 from Sylhet-2 as a Jatiya Party candidate.

Death 
Enamul Haque Chowdhury died on 16 September 2011.

See also 
 1979 Bangladeshi general election
 1986 Bangladeshi general election

References

External links 
 List of 2nd Parliament Members -Jatiya Sangsad (Bangla)
 List of 3rd Parliament Members -Jatiya Sangsad (Bangla)

1948 births
2011 deaths
People from Balaganj Upazila
Murari Chand College alumni
Madan Mohan College alumni
Jatiya Party politicians
2nd Jatiya Sangsad members
3rd Jatiya Sangsad members